Hans-Jürgen Irmer (born 20 February 1952) is a German politician of the Christian Democratic Union (CDU) who served as a member of the Bundestag from the state of Hesse from 2017 until 2021.

Political career 
Irmer became a member of the Bundestag in the 2017 German federal election. In parliament, he was a member of the Committee on Internal Affairs.

References

External links 

  
 Bundestag biography 

1952 births
Living people
Members of the Bundestag for Hesse
Members of the Bundestag 2017–2021
Members of the Bundestag for the Christian Democratic Union of Germany